John Bigland (175022 February 1832) was an English schoolmaster and later a historian.

Early life and education
He was born of poor parents at Skirlaugh in the Holderness area of the East Riding of Yorkshire.

Career
Bigland began his career as a village schoolmaster. In 1803, he published his first work occasioned, on his own account, by his religious scepticism. His work was a success, and he became a professional author, publishing in rapid succession a series of popular books, mainly connected with geography and history.

Works

He was the author of articles in magazines; of a continuation to April 1808 of George Lyttelton, 1st Baron Lyttelton's History of England in a Series of Letters from a Nobleman to his Son; and of an addition of the period of George III to Oliver Goldsmith's History of England. His other works include:

 Reflections on the Resurrection and Ascension of Christ (1803) 
 Letters on the Study and Use of Ancient and Modern History (1804)
 Letters on the Modern History and Political Aspect of Europe (1804) 
 Essays on Various Subjects (1805), two volumes 
 Letters on Natural History (1806) 
 A Geographical and Historical View of the World, Exhibiting a Complete Delineation of the Natural and Artificial Features of Each Country, &c. (1810), five volumes 
 A History of Spain from the Earliest Period to the Close of the Year 1809 (1810); translated and continued by Le Comte Mathieu Dumas to the epoch of the Restoration (1814), two volumes 
 A Sketch of the History of Europe from the Year 1783 to the Present Time (1811); in a later edition continued to 1814 (translated, and augmented in the military part, and continued to 1819 by Jacques W. MacCarthy, Paris, 1819), two volumes
 The Philosophical Wanderers, or the History of the Roman Tribune and the Priestess of Minerva, Exhibiting the Vicissitudes That Diversify the Fortunes of Nations and Individuals (1811) 
 Yorkshire, being the 16th volume of the Beauties of England and Wales (1812)
 A History of England from the Earliest Period to the Close of the War, 1814 (1815) two volumes 
 A System of Geography for the Use of Schools and Private Students (1816) 
 An Historical Display of the Effects of Physical and Moral Causes on the Character and Circumstances of Nations, Including a Comparison of the Ancients and Moderns in Regard to Their Intellectual and Social State (1816) 
 Letters on English History for the Use of Schools (1817) 
 Letters on French History for the Use of Schools (1818) 
 A Compendious History of the Jews (1820) 
 Memoirs (1830)

Personal life
Towards the end of his life, Bigland resided at Finningley, near Doncaster, South Yorkshire. He died, age eighty-two, in Finningley.

See also

 List of historians by area of study
 List of people from Yorkshire

References
Dictionary of National Biography, "Bigland, John (1750–1832), schoolmaster and author", by James Mew. Published 1885.

Attribution

External links
 

1750 births
People from Skirlaugh
People from Nottinghamshire (before 1974)
1832 deaths
18th-century English historians
19th-century English historians
English antiquarians
Historians of England
Historians of ancient Rome
Historians of Jews and Judaism
Historians of Spain
Schoolteachers from Yorkshire